The Sunshine Coast Solar Farm is a photovoltaic power station operating on a  site in Valdora in the Sunshine Coast near Yandina, in Queensland, Australia. The station has a maximum generating capacity of 15 megawatts, generated from 57,850 photovoltaic panels.

Solar power stations in Queensland